Philippa Congsby ( Fitzwilliam; 1530, Milton, Northamptonshire – 1596) married to Sir Thomas Coningsby and had 11 children.

As wife of Sir Thomas Coningsby she lived at Leominster and Hampton Court, Herefordshire. Coningsby wrote in a letter to Sir Robert Cecil that his wife was his "near kinswoman".

References 

1530 births
1596 deaths
16th-century English people
People from West Northamptonshire District
Wives of knights